The 1920 Paisley by-election was a parliamentary by-election held on 12 February 1920 for the House of Commons constituency of Paisley in Scotland. It was caused by the death of the constituency's sitting Liberal Member of Parliament Sir John Mills McCallum. Former Prime Minister H.H. Asquith, who was still leader of the Liberal Party but who had lost his seat at the 1918 general election, returned to the Commons.

Electoral history
The result at the last General Election in 1918 was;

Asquith’s return
The by-election provided an opportunity for the return to Parliament of H. H. Asquith, the former Prime Minister who had lost his East Fife seat to the Unionists at the 1918 general election in the aftermath of the split in the Liberal Party over David Lloyd George's coalition with the Conservatives. Asquith remained party leader, and the opponents of the coalition came to be known as the Independent Liberals, or unofficially as the ‘Wee Frees’ after a Scottish religious sect of that name.

Initially, it was widely expected that Biggar, who had nearly won the seat in 1918 and who was endorsed by nine former Liberal MPs, would win. The Liberal Party in the constituency was split between supporters of Asquith and Lloyd George, and Asquith, whose continued leadership of the Liberal Party was being much criticised, was only narrowly selected as candidate, although after his formal adoption on 21 January 1920 the local Liberal Association united behind him. He initially had misgivings about returning to Scotland and risking his career, but grew more confident as the campaign progressed. 

Asquith had been an opponent of women’s suffrage (women over thirty were given the vote under the Representation of the People Act 1918), and (30 January 1920) thought women voters “hopelessly ignorant, credulous to the last degree, and flickering with gusts of sentiment like a candle in the wind. Then there are some thousands of Irish, who have been ordered by their bosses to vote Labour – as if Labour had ever done or was ever likely to do anything for them”. Asquith directed most of his campaign not against Labour but against the Coalition candidate, whom he thought “a foul-mouthed Tory”. He condemned the Treaty of Versailles and called for moderation over German reparations, immediate Dominion Status for Ireland (where the Irish War of Independence was currently in progress) and warned of the danger of tariffs being erected, especially by the newly independent small states of Central and Eastern Europe.

Political biographer John Campbell noted parallels between the Paisley campaign condemning Lloyd George's opportunism and the Paris Peace Conference to William Ewart Gladstone's Midlothian campaign condemning Benjamin Disraeli and the Congress of Berlin. Such comparisons were made at the time, although Asquith himself was more circumspect.
Sir John Simon and Lord Buckmaster spoke in Asquith's support, as did his daughter Violet who had become an excellent speaker. The “foul-mouthed Tory” lost his deposit (by ten votes), to Asquith’s delight.

The by-election seemed to be a triumph for the Independent Liberals with a majority of 2,834 votes over Labour and a blow for the government.

Result

Aftermath
At the following General Election in 1922, Asquith held the seat narrowly, with a much reduced majority (albeit a slightly larger share of the vote) in a two-horse race against Labour. The result was:

Asquith held the seat again at the 1923 election but was defeated by Labour at the 1924 election. He was then elevated to the House of Lords as Earl of Oxford and Asquith.

References

Further reading
 
 
The Radical Thread: Political Change in Scotland. Paisley Politics, 1885-1924 by Catriona M M MacDonald, Scottish Historical Review, 2000
Victory at Paisley; Graeme Peters on Asquith’s return to Parliament; Journal of Liberal History, Issue 19, Summer 1998, p14 & 17 https://web.archive.org/web/20110617010157/http://www.liberalhistory.org.uk/uploads/19_peters_victory_at_paisley.pdf 
Hold on, hold out; we are coming; Ian Hunter on the speech made by Lady Violet Bonham Carter on the return of her father to Parliament; Journal of Liberal History, Issue 37, Winter 2002-03 pp 22–25 https://web.archive.org/web/20120502132739/http://www.liberalhistory.org.uk/uploads/37-Winter%25202002-03.pdf

By-elections to the Parliament of the United Kingdom in Scottish constituencies
1920 elections in the United Kingdom
1920 in Scotland
1920s elections in Scotland
Politics of Paisley, Renfrewshire
H. H. Asquith